The Ohio State Buckeyes field hockey team is the intercollegiate field hockey program representing Ohio State University. The school competes in the Big Ten Conference in Division I of the National Collegiate Athletic Association (NCAA). The Ohio State field hockey team plays its home games at Buckeye Varsity Field on the university campus in Columbus, Ohio. Since the establishment of the field hockey program in 1971, the Buckeyes have won three Big Ten conference regular-season championships, one conference tournament title, and have appeared in the NCAA tournament seven times. The team is currently coached by Jarred Martin.

History 

Field hockey has been a varsity sport at Ohio State University since 1971. From 1982 to 1988 and again from 1992 to the present, Ohio State has played in the Big Ten Conference. Between 1989 and 1991, the team played in the Midwestern Collegiate Field Hockey Conference. The Buckeyes have won three regular-season Big Ten championships, in 2001, 2006, and 2010, and one Big Ten conference tournament title, in 2001. Ohio State has also made seven appearances in the NCAA tournament, advancing past the first round twice, and once reaching the semifinals, in 2010. The Buckeyes are currently coached by Anne Wilkinson, who is in her 19th season as the team's head coach. Prior to her tenure, Ohio State had previously been coached by Mary Raysa (1971–72), Harriet Reynolds (1973–86), and Karen Weaver (1987–95).

Season-by-season results 

Season-by-season results through the end of the 2014 season

Awards and accolades

Conference championships
Ohio State has won three conference titles, all in the Big Ten Conference and under the guidance of head coach Anne Wilkinson.

All-Americans

Olympians

Individual honors through the end of the 2014 season

Stadium 
Ohio State has played its home games at Buckeye Varsity Field since its opening in August 2010. The field's permanent bleacher seating gives it a capacity of 500, and it features an AstroTurf 12 playing surface. Located adjacent to the Woody Hayes Athletic Center, the university's indoor strength and conditioning facility, Buckeye Varsity Field features 3/8" closed-cell perforated foam padding as well as a press box and a scoreboard. The Buckeyes' home field hockey locker rooms are located at the adjacent Biggs Athletic Facility, which also provides the team with a full-service athletic training room. Visiting teams typically utilize the locker rooms at Buckeye Field, the home of the Ohio State softball team.

See also
List of NCAA Division I field hockey programs

References

External links